Saint Beatrix d'Este (1230 - 18 January 1262) belonged to the family of the Norman Dukes of Apulia and was herself the daughter of the Marquis of Ferrara; she was a niece of Blessed Beatrice d'Este. She was betrothed to Galeazzo Manfredi of Vicenza, but he died of his wounds after a battle, just before the wedding day. His bride refused to return home, but attended by some of her maidens, devoted herself to the service of God, following the Benedictine rule, at the convent of Sant'Antonio in Polesine, at San Lazzaro just outside Ferrara. Her cult was approved by Clement XIV, and Pius VI allowed her festival to be kept on 19 January.

Notes

Bibliography 
 Faustino Mostardi, La Beata Beatrice II d'Este, Venice, Fondazione Cini, 1963
 Bibliotheca Sanctorum, Beatrice, Praglia Abbey (Padua - Italy) vol. II ag 994, 1962
 Sautto Alfonso, Le tre Beatrici d’Este, Associazione Cattolica di Cultura, 1933, Monastero di Sant’Antonio di Ferrara -Italy

See also

List of Catholic saints

1226 deaths
13th-century Christian saints
1191 births
Female saints of medieval Italy
Italian Roman Catholic saints
13th-century Italian nobility
Medieval Italian saints
Beatifications by Pope Clement XIV
13th-century Italian women